Finland was represented by Kaija Kärkinen, with the song "Hullu yö", at the 1991 Eurovision Song Contest, which took place on 4 May in Rome. "Hullu yö" was chosen as the Finnish entry at the national final organised by broadcaster Yle and held on 2 March.

Before Eurovision

National final 
The final was held at the Typhon Hall in Turku, hosted by Kati Bergman. Ten songs took part with the winner chosen by an "expert" jury, which included Tina Pettersson, who had represented Finland in 1990 with the group Beat, and veteran Finnish Eurovision conductor Ossi Runne. Other participants included former Finnish representatives Riki Sorsa (1981) and Kirka (1984).

At Eurovision 
On the night of the final Kärkinen performed 16th in the running order, following Israel and preceding Germany. "Hullu yö" was the only rock-influenced song in the 1991 contest, but went largely unappreciated by the national juries as at the close of voting it had received only 6 points, placing Finland 20th of the 22 entries. The Finnish jury awarded its 12 points to Italy.

Voting

References

External links
 Full national final on Yle Elävä Arkisto

1991
Countries in the Eurovision Song Contest 1991
Eurovision